"Stupid Boy" is a song written by Dave Berg, Deanna Bryant, and Sarah Buxton. Originally recorded by Buxton, the song was later recorded by Australian country music singer Keith Urban on his 2006 album Love, Pain & the Whole Crazy Thing. Urban's version was released as that album's second single in December 2006 and peaked at number 3 on the US Billboard Hot Country Songs chart. A year after its release, Urban won a Grammy Award for Best Male Country Vocal Performance of the song.

History
Urban told Billboard that he recorded "Stupid Boy" at the suggestion of his wife, actress Nicole Kidman. He also noted how the song's subject matter contrasted with the more up-tempo love song "Once in a Lifetime," the album's first single, saying that the two songs were "yin and yang." Sarah Buxton, who co-wrote the song, recorded a version before Urban did. This version was included on a 2007 extended play entitled Almost My Record as well as Buxton's 2010 self-titled album.

Critical reception
Tamara Conniff and Ray Waddell of Billboard described the song as "a ballad on how men foolishly break the hearts of the women they love." Associated Press reviewer Michael McCall called it "a funky, witty take on a guy who can't appreciate how good he has it."

In 2008, the song won Urban a Grammy Award for Best Male Country Vocal Performance.

Personnel
As listed in liner notes.
Tom Bukovac – rhythm guitar
Eric Darken – percussion
Dann Huff – rhythm guitar
Rami Jaffee – Hammond B-3 organ
Tim Lauer – pump organ, synthesizer
Chris McHugh – drums
Jimmie Lee Sloas – bass guitar
Keith Urban – lead guitar, acoustic guitar, all vocals

Chart performance
Urban's rendition of "Stupid Boy" peaked at number 3 on the US Billboard Hot Country Songs chart.

Year-end charts

Certifications

Cassadee Pope version

Cassadee Pope performed this song on NBC's singing competition show, The Voice. Pope went on to win the competition, and her studio version of the song reached the top of the iTunes Top 10 Singles the day after the song was released.

References

2006 singles
Sarah Buxton songs
Keith Urban songs
Cassadee Pope songs
Song recordings produced by Dann Huff
Songs written by Dave Berg (songwriter)
Songs written by Sarah Buxton
Capitol Records Nashville singles
Universal Republic Records singles
Music videos directed by Chris Hicky
Songs written by Deanna Bryant
Grammy Award for Best Male Country Vocal Performance winners
2006 songs
Country ballads